Robnett is a surname. Notable people with the surname include:

Ed Robnett (1920–1990), American football player
Marshall Robnett (1918–1967), American football player, brother of Ed